Nuiqsut Airport  is a public use airport located in Nuiqsut, a city in the North Slope Borough of the U.S. state of Alaska. It is owned by North Slope Borough.

Although most U.S. airports use the same three-letter location identifier for the FAA and IATA, this airport is assigned AQT by the FAA and NUI by the IATA. The airport's ICAO identifier is PAQT.

Facilities and aircraft 
Nuiqsut Airport has one runway designated 4/22 with a gravel surface measuring 4,343 by 90 feet (1,324 x 27 m).

For the 12-month period ending December 31, 2005, the airport had 1,800 aircraft operations, an average of 150 per month: 83% air taxi, 11% military and 6% general aviation.

Airlines and destinations 

Prior to its bankruptcy and cessation of all operations, Ravn Alaska served the airport from multiple locations.

Top destinations

References

External links 
 FAA Alaska airport diagram (GIF)
 

Airports in North Slope Borough, Alaska